Zingiberene is a monocyclic sesquiterpene that is the predominant constituent of the oil of ginger (Zingiber officinale), from which it gets its name. It can contribute up to 30% of the essential oils in ginger rhizomes. This is the compound that gives ginger its distinct flavoring.

Biosynthesis

Zingiberene is formed in the isoprenoid pathway from farnesyl pyrophosphate (FPP). FPP undergoes a rearrangement to give nerolidyl diphosphate. After the removal of pyrophosphate, the ring closes leaving a carbocation on the tertiary carbon attached to the ring. A 1,3-hydride shift then takes place to give a more stable allylic carbocation. The final step in the formation of zingiberene is the removal of the cyclic allylic proton and consequent formation of a double bond. Zingiberene synthase is the enzyme responsible for catalyzing the reaction forming zingiberene as well as other mono- and sesquiterpenes.

See also
 Gingerol
 sequiphellandrene

References 

Sesquiterpenes
Alkene derivatives
Ginger
Cyclohexadienes